Reghan Tumilty (born 26 February 1997) is a Scottish professional footballer who plays as a defender for Scottish Championship side Hamilton Academical.

Career
Tumilty started his career at Dundee United in 2013 but was transferred to Ross County on 10 June 2016. On 28 December 2016, he made his senior debut, coming on as a substitute against Celtic and on 16 April 2017 he made his first competitive start, also against Celtic.

Tumilty was loaned to Falkirk in November 2017, with the loan extended until the end of the season on 17 January 2018. He left Ross County in May 2018.

On 17 July 2018, Tumilty signed for Greenock Morton on a one-year contract.  He scored on the same day against Partick Thistle in the League Cup, his first competitive match and goal in the competition. After making forty appearances, he extended his contract in June 2019. On 24 August 2019, Tumilty joined Dumbarton on loan until January 2020. scoring on his debut for them against Stranraer on the same day.

On 3 August 2020, Tumilty signed a two-year contract with Scottish Championship club Raith Rovers. During his spell with Raith, Tumilty made 85 appearances.

On 21 June 2022, Tumilty moved into the English divisions, signing for League Two side Hartlepool United. Tumilty was signed by Paul Hartley, formerly of Cove Rangers who also signed several other players from the Scottish divisions. In November 2022, Tumilty scored his first goal for the club which was a late equaliser in a 1–1 draw with Solihull Moors in an FA Cup first round replay which Hartlepool won on penalties. On 24 January 2023, Tumilty left Hartlepool with mutual consent.

In February 2023, Tumilty signed for Scottish Championship side Hamilton Academical.

Career statistics

Honours
 Raith Rovers
Scottish Challenge Cup : 2021–22

References

External links

1997 births
Association football defenders
Dundee United F.C. players
Falkirk F.C. players
Greenock Morton F.C. players
Living people
Ross County F.C. players
Scottish footballers
Scottish Professional Football League players
Footballers from Glasgow
Dumbarton F.C. players
Raith Rovers F.C. players
Hartlepool United F.C. players
Hamilton Academical F.C. players
English Football League players